Secobarbital (as the sodium salt, originally marketed by Eli Lilly and Company for the treatment of insomnia, and subsequently by other companies as described below, under the brand name Seconal) is a short-acting barbiturate derivative drug that was patented in 1934 in the United States. It possesses anaesthetic, anticonvulsant, anxiolytic, sedative, and hypnotic properties. In the United Kingdom, it was known as quinalbarbitone. It is the most frequently used drug in physician-assisted suicide within the United States. Secobarbital is considered to be an obsolete sedative-hypnotic (sleeping pill), and as a result, it has largely been replaced by the benzodiazepine family. Seconal was widely abused, known on the street as "red devils" or "reds".

Indications

Secobarbital is indicated for:
Treatment of epilepsy
Temporary treatment of insomnia
Use as a preoperative medication to produce anaesthesia and anxiolysis in short surgical, diagnostic, or therapeutic procedures which are minimally painful.

Availability

Ranbaxy Pharmaceuticals, an India-based company now predominantly owned by the Japanese company Daiichi Sankyo, obtained the rights to market and to use the trade name Seconal from Eli Lilly in 1998 and did so until September 18, 2008. The actual manufacturer of Seconal subsequent to the time Eli Lilly manufactured the drug was Ohm Pharmaceuticals, a wholly owned subsidiary of Ranbaxy. The rights to market Seconal were then sold to Marathon Pharmaceuticals, which became the marketer and trade-name holder. At the time Marathon Pharmaceuticals obtained ownership of the brand name, the retail price for one 100 mg capsule (depending upon prescription size and pharmacy) averaged about one U.S. dollar.  During the time Marathon owned the brand name, the Company greatly increased the price of the drug.  By February 2015, when Marathon sold the rights to Valeant Pharmaceuticals, the average retail price per 100 mg capsule had risen to over thirty dollars.  Since its acquisition of the trade name, Valeant Pharmaceuticals made little, if any, change to the pricing of Seconal. Despite the price increases implemented by Marathon Pharmaceuticals, Seconal was still manufactured by Ohm. In the United States, Seconal is available only in 100 mg capsules, as a sodium salt. The salt is a white hygroscopic powder that is soluble in water and ethanol.

While generic versions of the drug were in existence after Eli Lilly's patent of the name Seconal expired, currently there are no companies that manufacture the drug generically in the United States.  Until 2020, Valeant was the sole marketer of Seconal in the United States.  As of 2021, Valeant discontinued the product, and Bausch Health is the sole supplier of Seconal. But the product is currently experiencing a shortage and is unavailable, with no estimated date of resupply.

Secobarbital sodium

The sodium salt of secobarbital is classified separately from the free acid, as follows:
CAS number: 309-43-3
Chemical formula: C12H18N2NaO3
Molecular weight: 260.265

Side effects
Possible side effects of secobarbital include:
Somnolence
Impaired motor functions
 Impaired coordination
 Impaired balance (Ataxia)
 Dizziness
Anxiety
Confusion                       
Agitation, irritability, or excitability
Headache
Hunger
Nausea
Vomiting
Nightmares
Increased sensitivity to pain
Allergic reactions
 Difficulty breathing
 Edema
 Urticaria

Withdrawal
Secobarbital may produce psychological addiction and produces physical dependence if used for an extended period of time. Withdrawal symptoms may occur if long-term use is abruptly ended and can include:

Anxiety
Insomnia
Lack of appetite
Seizures
Tremors
Possible death as a result of withdrawal

Recreational and lethal use

Secobarbital was widely abused for recreational purposes in the 1960s, 1970s, and 1980s, and accidental overdose was associated with the drug. Lilly's Seconal came in a bright orange/red bullet shaped capsule known as a Pulvule. Prescription use of secobarbital decreased beginning in the early 1980s by which time benzodiazepines had become increasingly common. Secobarbital has acquired many nicknames, the most common being "reds," "red devils," or "red dillies" (because of the color of the capsules). Other common nicknames are "seccies," "Cardinals," "ruby slippers," and, according to the Wegman's School of Pharmacy curriculum, "red hearts". A less common nickname is "dolls"; this was partly responsible for the title of Jacqueline Susann's novel Valley of the Dolls, whose main characters use secobarbital and other such drugs. Actresses Carole Landis, Judy Garland, and journalist Dorothy Kilgallen allegedly either died by suicide or of accidentally overdosing on secobarbital. Seconal was used to induce Fred Hampton into docility before he was then executed in his bed in the early hours of December 4,1969.

In 1978, 1000 pills of Seconal were recovered in Jonestown, along with substantial quantities of Valium, Thorazine, Talwin, Demerol, and other sedatives, hypnotics, and analgesics.

Use in animal and human euthanasia
In the Netherlands, individuals have two options for euthanasia. They can orally consume 100 ml of concentrated syrup containing either 15 grams of pentobarbital or 15 grams of secobarbital, or they can choose to have 2 grams of thiopental or 1 gram of propofol administered intravenously by a doctor, followed by a muscle relaxant. In recent years only 15% of those who died by euthanasia opted for orally consuming the lethal drug(s), the rest choosing to have the drugs administered intravenously by a doctor instead.

In the United States, secobarbital and pentobarbital are the most common drugs prescribed under physician aid-in-dying laws in Oregon since 1998, Washington since 2008, and Vermont since 2013.  Ranbaxy Laboratories Limited previously experienced various issues in their attempts to produce 100 mg secobarbital capsules. 

In 2017, secobarbital was made available for physician-assisted suicide in Canada. 

It is a component in the veterinary drug Somulose, used for euthanasia of horses and cattle.

The  of secobarbital has been reported to be between 125 mg/kg (rat, oral) and 267 mg/kg (mouse, oral).

See also 
 Tuinal

References

External links 
Marathon Pharmaceuticals - Seconal Full prescribing information for the United States.
RxList.com - Secobarbital Consumer information.

General anesthetics
Barbiturates
Eli Lilly and Company brands
Allyl compounds
GABAA receptor positive allosteric modulators